Harlem Yu (born 28 July 1961) is a Taiwanese singer-songwriter, television host and businessman. He is particularly well-known for singing the theme song, Qing Fei De Yi, for the 2001 television drama, Meteor Garden. He made a cameo in both that version and the 2018 remake, Meteor Garden performing Qing Fei De Yi. He has been hosting television shows in Taiwan since 1994 and in China since 2011, and served as a coach for three seasons of The Voice of China and three seasons of Sing! China.

Career
Best known for being one of the first artists in the Mandopop music industry to experiment with R&B and rap, he has released more than 15 studio albums since 1986.

Apart from music, Yu also hosts television variety shows. His other investments include: mega force studio, AoBa Taiwanese cuisine restaurant, Legacy Taipei (Livehouse), etc.

Discography

Studio albums

Extended plays

Band albums

Compilations

Cover albums

Soundtrack contributions
 2001 Meteor Garden: "情非得已" - opening theme song
 2005 Hong Kong Disneyland: The Grand Opening Celebration Album - "Can You Feel the Love Tonight" (from The Lion King) (Mandarin)
 2006 Silence: "靜靜的" (Silently) - opening theme song
 2018 Meteor Garden 2018: "情非得已"

Filmography

Television series

Film

TV hosting

Published works

Awards and nominations

References

External links
  Harlem's Blog
  Harlem's profile@Linfair Records 
  Harlem official Facebook
  Harlem blog@sina.com
  Harlem@Sony Music Taiwan

1961 births
Living people
20th-century Taiwanese  male singers
21st-century Taiwanese  male singers
Male actors from Taipei
Musicians from Taipei
Taiwanese male film actors
Taiwanese Mandopop singer-songwriters
Taiwanese male television actors